The Army of Free Tribes (Jaysh Ahrar al-Ashayer), previously called the Southern Command and the Collective of Free Southern Tribesmen, is a Syrian rebel coalition affiliated with the Free Syrian Army and was headed by Brigadier General Ibrahim Fahad Al Naimi. The group was supported by Jordan.

History
The Southern Command of the Free Syrian Army was established on 5 September 2014 in the Quneitra Governorate. The group's commander, Brig. Gen. Ibrahim Fahad al-Naimi, threatened to arrest any rebel deserting the group.  

It was reported on 3 November 2014 that the Southern Command convinced the al-Nusra Front to leave Ghadir al-Bustan and al-Qseibah villages in the Quneitra Governorate, some miles away from the Golan Heights.

Member groups
 Division 70
 Division 90
 Brigade Corps 72
 Infantry Brigade 71
 Infantry Brigade 73
 Infantry Brigade 305
 Brigade 51
 Brigade 52
 Brigade 53
 Brigade 91
 Brigade 92
 Brigade 93
 Brigade 94
 Brigade 95
 Tank Battalion 911
 Sapper Battalion 50
 "Knights of Sharia" Battalion
 Special Tasks Battalion
 "Horan" Commando Battalion
 Martyrs Brigade of Nawa
 The Banner of the Liberation of Nawa
 Omar Mukhtar Brigade 
 Supporters of the Rightfulness Brigade
 Assault Brigade Horan
 Abdullah Hourani Brigade
 Special Brigade of South Farouq
 Homs Walid Brigade
 Martyr Imad Nasrallah Brigade
 Southern Hawks Brigade

See also
List of armed groups in the Syrian Civil War

References

Anti-government factions of the Syrian civil war
Anti-ISIL factions in Syria
Free Syrian Army
Military units and formations established in 2014